Rancho Los Nietos was one of the first, and the largest, Spanish land concession in Alta California. Located in present-day Los Angeles County and Orange County, California. Rancho Los Nietos was awarded to Manuel Nieto in 1784.  The rancho remained intact until 1834, when Governor Jose Figueroa officially declared the Rancho Los Nietos grant under Mexican rule and ordered its partition into six smaller ranchos.

Today, all parts of the following places are located on what was once Rancho Los Nietos, spanning the cities of Southest LA and north Orange County:
										

Anaheim
Artesia
Bellflower
Buena Park
Bolsa Chica State Beach—Bolsa Chica Reserve
Cerritos

Cypress
Downey
Fullerton
Garden Grove
Huntington Beach
Lakewood
Long Beach

Los Alamitos
Naples
Norwalk 
Santa Fe Springs
Seal Beach
Sunset Beach
Whittier

History

Spanish grant
 
In 1784, Spanish governor Pedro Fages granted to Manuel Nieto, a former sergeant in the Spanish army, provisional use of all land between the Santa Ana River and the Los Angeles River from the Mission San Gabriel Arcángel to the sea.  

At first it was called La Zanja, but later it was known simply as Rancho Los Nietos.

Upon Manuel Nieto's death in 1804, Rancho Los Nietos passed to his wife and four children.

Mexican declaration and partition

The rancho remained intact until 1833, when the Nieto heirs petitioned Mexican Governor José Figueroa for a partition and distribution of the land. In 1834, governor Figueroa officially declared the Los Nietos grant under Mexican rule and ordered its partition into six smaller ranchos.

 

Rancho Palo Alto was the smallest of the six ranchos. It is unknown exactly where or how large was Rancho Palo Alto as it did not appear on the partition map. It included the Coyote Hills and most of the Arroyo de los Coyotes, and may have been combined into Rancho Los Coyotes.

Legacy
Los Nietos Road in Santa Fe Springs and the unincorporated community known as West Whittier-Los Nietos are named after the rancho.

References

Nietos, Los
Los Nietos
Los Nietos
History of Los Angeles County, California
History of Orange County, California
History of Long Beach, California
1784 in Alta California
1784 establishments in Alta California
Anaheim, California 
Buena Park, California 
Cerritos, California
Cypress, California
Downey, California
Fullerton, California
Garden Grove, California
Lakewood, California
Norwalk, California
Santa Fe Springs, California
Whittier, California
18th century in Los Angeles